Classical control theory is a branch of control theory that deals with the behavior of dynamical systems with inputs, and how their behavior is modified by feedback, using the Laplace transform as a basic tool to model such systems.

The usual objective of control theory is to control a system, often called the plant, so its output follows a desired control signal, called the reference, which may be a fixed or changing value.  To do this a controller is designed, which monitors the output and compares it with the reference.  The difference between actual and desired output, called the error signal, is applied as feedback to the input of the system, to bring the actual output closer to the reference.

Classical control theory deals with linear time-invariant single-input single-output (SISO) systems. The Laplace transform of the input and output signal of such systems can be calculated. The transfer function relates the Laplace transform of the input and the output.

Feedback

To overcome the limitations of the open-loop controller, classical control theory introduces feedback. A closed-loop controller uses feedback to control states or outputs of a dynamical system. Its name comes from the information path in the system: process inputs (e.g., voltage applied to an electric motor) have an effect on the process outputs (e.g., speed or torque of the motor), which is measured with sensors and processed by the controller; the result (the control signal) is "fed back" as input to the process, closing the loop.

Closed-loop controllers have the following advantages over open-loop controllers:
 disturbance rejection (such as hills in a cruise control)
 guaranteed performance even with model uncertainties, when the model structure does not match perfectly the real process and the model parameters are not exact
 unstable processes can be stabilized
 reduced sensitivity to parameter variations
 improved reference tracking performance

In some systems, closed-loop and open-loop control are used simultaneously. In such systems, the open-loop control is termed feedforward and serves to further improve reference tracking performance.

A common closed-loop controller architecture is the PID controller.

Classical vs modern

A Physical system can be modeled in the "time domain", where the response of a given system is a function of the various inputs, the previous system values, and time. As time progresses, the state of the system and its response change. However, time-domain models for systems are frequently modeled using high-order differential equations which can become impossibly difficult for humans to solve and some of which can even become impossible for modern computer systems to solve efficiently.

To counteract this problem, classical control theory uses the Laplace transform to change an Ordinary Differential Equation (ODE) in the time domain into a regular algebraic polynomial in the frequency domain. Once a given system has been converted into the frequency domain it can be manipulated with greater ease.

Modern control theory, instead of changing domains to avoid the complexities of time-domain ODE mathematics, converts the differential equations into a system of lower-order time domain equations called state equations, which can then be manipulated using techniques from linear algebra.

Laplace transform

Classical control theory uses the Laplace transform to model the systems and signals. The Laplace transform is a frequency-domain approach for continuous time signals irrespective of whether the system is stable or unstable. The Laplace transform of a function , defined for all real numbers , is the function , which is a unilateral transform defined by
 
where s is a complex number frequency parameter

Closed-loop transfer function

A common feedback control architecture is the servo loop, in which the output of the system y(t) is measured using a sensor F and subtracted from the reference value r(t) to form the servo error e. The controller C then uses the servo error e to adjust the input u to the plant (system being controlled) P in order to drive the output of the plant toward the reference. This is shown in the block diagram below. This kind of controller is a closed-loop controller or feedback controller.

This is called a single-input-single-output (SISO) control system; MIMO (i.e., Multi-Input-Multi-Output) systems, with more than one input/output, are common. In such cases variables are represented through vectors instead of simple scalar values. For some distributed parameter systems the vectors may be infinite-dimensional (typically functions).

If we assume the controller C, the plant P, and the sensor F are linear and time-invariant (i.e., elements of their transfer function C(s), P(s), and F(s) do not depend on time), the systems above can be analysed using the Laplace transform on the variables. This gives the following relations:

 
 
 

Solving for Y(s) in terms of R(s) gives

 

The expression  is referred to as the closed-loop transfer function of the system.

PID controller

The PID controller is probably the most-used (alongside much cruder Bang-bang control) feedback control design. PID is an initialism for Proportional-Integral-Derivative, referring to the three terms operating on the error signal to produce a control signal.

Stability can often be ensured using only the proportional term. The integral term permits the rejection of a step disturbance (often a striking specification in process control). The derivative term is used to provide damping or shaping of the response. PID controllers are the most well established class of control systems: however, they cannot be used in several more complicated cases, especially if multiple-input multiple-output systems (MIMO) systems are considered.

Applying Laplace transformation results in the transformed PID controller equation

with the PID controller transfer function

There exists a nice example of the closed-loop system discussed above. If we take

PID controller transfer function in series form

1st order filter in feedback loop

linear actuator with filtered input

,    = const

and insert all this into expression for closed-loop transfer function , then tuning is very easy: simply put

and get  identically.

For practical PID controllers, a pure differentiator is neither physically realisable nor desirable due to amplification of noise and resonant modes in the system. Therefore, a phase-lead compensator type approach is used instead, or a differentiator with low-pass roll-off.

Tools

Classical control theory uses an array of tools to analyze systems and design controllers for such systems. Tools include the root locus, the Nyquist stability criterion, the Bode plot, the gain margin and phase margin.  More advanced tools include Bode integrals to assess performance limitations and trade-offs, and describing functions to analyze nonlinearities in the frequency domain.

See also
 Minor loop feedback a classical method for designing feedback control systems.
 State space (control)

References

 
Control engineering
Mathematical modeling